Charles Hardy (c. 1714–1780) was a Royal Navy officer and colonial governor of New York.

Charles Hardy may also refer to:
Charles Hardy (Royal Navy officer, died 1744) (1680–1744), Royal Navy officer and father of the above
Charles Hardy (Australian politician) (1898–1941), Australian politician
Charles Leach Hardy (1919–2010), U.S. federal judge
Charlie Hardy (1887–1968), Australian rules footballer
Charles Albert Creery Hardy (1865–1922), New Zealand politician
Charles Hardy (eater), competitive eater from Brooklyn, New York, USA
Charles Stewart Hardy, owner of the Chilham Castle during part of the 19th century